The BMW Goldfisch is a SOHC 32-valve V16 6.7-litre prototype automotive piston engine based on the BMW M70 V12 engine.

Development

Development started in the late 1980s. The engine was built to demonstrate the maximum potential of the small cylinder displacement engine family. Also, a three cylinder model of the same engine family was made to set a minimum. Development started on July 8, 1987, and by the beginning of 1988 the engine was ready. It was put on a dynamometer in January and February 1988. Afterwards, it was installed in a modified long wheelbase BMW 7 Series (E32), and the first driving tests were made in May 1988. On July 7, 1988, the engine was presented internally within BMW.

To prevent an "arms race" with other engine manufacturers, the V16 was never put into mass production.

This engine was also trialled in the Bentley Mulsanne as a potential "upgrade" from a turbocharged V8 engine. Unlike the 7 Series, the engine fit in the bay with room for radiator and ancillaries.

Technology and performance

The engine design virtually copies the BMW M70 V12 layout but with 4 more cylinders added.
 6,651 cm3 60°-V16 engine
 Cast aluminium block and cylinder heads
 SOHC, 2 valves per cylinder
 Bore and stroke: 
 Bore spacing: 
 Compression ratio: 8.8:1
 Maximum power:  at 5,200 rpm
 Maximum torque: 62.5 kp·m (613 N·m) at 3,900 rpm
 Redline: 6,000 rpm
 Engine management: 2 separate Bosch DME 3.3 for each bank
 Dry weight:

See also
 List of BMW engines

Notes

References

Bibliography
 

Goldfisch V16
V16 engines
Gasoline engines by model